Notviken is a residential area in Luleå, Sweden. It had 2,518 inhabitants in 2010.

References

External links
Notviken at Luleå Municipality

Luleå